The Underground Railroad was a network of escape routes for slaves in the 19th century United States.

Underground Railroad may also refer to:

Works related to the original Underground Railroad
The Underground Railroad (book), 1872 book by William Still
The Underground Railroad (novel), 2016 novel by Colson Whitehead
 The Underground Railroad (miniseries), 2021 miniseries based on the Colson Whitehead novel
Race to Freedom: The Underground Railroad, 1994 Canadian television film featuring Tyrone Benskin

Other uses

Music
Underground Railroad (album), 1969 album by saxophonist and composer Joe McPhee
Underground Railroad (band), French post-punk band based in London

Transport
Railways built underground, see rapid transit

Organizations
Operation Underground Railroad, a group devoted to rescuing victims of human trafficking and sex trafficking

See also
Underground railway (disambiguation)